Colored fire is a common pyrotechnic effect used in stage productions, fireworks and by fire performers the world over. Generally, the color of a flame may be red, orange, blue, yellow, or white, and is dominated by blackbody radiation from soot and steam. When additional chemicals are added to the fuel burning, their atomic emission spectra can affect the frequencies of visible light radiation emitted - in other words, the flame appears in a different color dependent upon the chemical additives. Flame coloring is also a good way to demonstrate how fire changes when subjected to heat and how they also change the matter around them.

To color their flames, pyrotechnicians will generally use metal salts. Specific combinations of fuels and co-solvents are required in order to dissolve the necessary chemicals. Color enhancers (usually chlorine donors) are frequently added too, the most common of which is polyvinyl chloride. A practical use of colored fire is the flame test, where metal cations are tested by placing the sample in a flame and analyzing the color produced.

Flame colorants

Emitted colors depend on the electronic configuration of the elements involved. Heat energy from the flame excites electrons to a higher quantum level, and the atoms emit characteristic colors (photons with energies corresponding to the visible spectrum) as they return to lower energy levels

Campfire colorants

Flame colorants are becoming popular while camping. Scouts  and other outdoor enthusiasts have placed sections of copper pipe with holes drilled throughout and stuffed with garden hose onto campfires to create a variety of flame colors.  An easier method of coloring campfires has been fueled by commercial products.  These packages of flame colorants are tossed onto a campfire or into a fireplace to produce effects.

Although these chemicals are very effective at imparting their color into an already existing flame, these substances are not flammable alone. To produce a powder or solid that, when lit, produces a colored flame, the necessary steps are more complex. To get a powder to burn satisfactorily, both a fuel and oxidizer will mostly be needed. Common oxidizers include.

 Ammonium perchlorate
 Ammonium nitrate
 Barium chlorate
 Potassium nitrate (saltpeter)
 Potassium chlorate
 Potassium perchlorate
 Strontium nitrate
 Sodium nitrate

Many of these oxidizers also produce a colored flame by themselves. Some of them - as well as the main colorants - are severely toxic and therefore environmentally damaging.

References 

Pyrotechnics